, in the context of metal blade  construction/metalwork, refers to a knife, blade or sword that has  the hard steel hagane forming the blade's edge, and the iron/stainless forming a jacket on both sides. It is also the term used to refer to the technique used to create these blades.

Origin and use of the term
"San mai" roughly translates as three flat things, in Japanese (San=three Mai=unit counter for flat objects). The term, and its root honsanmai, has been used to describe  that construction method for many hundreds of years, from around 1300 A.D. It refers to when three layers of steel are used. The center is hard, and the side is typically softer.
As san mai is a generic term for a technique, the term can't be trademarked. 
Outside the specific context of blade construction technique, the term, in general use in Japan, refers to three flat things (e.g. three tickets, or three pieces of paper), mai 枚, being the counter unit term for flat objects in Japanese.

Technique
In stainless versions,  this technique offers a practical and visible advantage of a superb cutting edge of modern Japanese knife steel, with a corrosion-resistant exterior. In professional Japanese kitchens, the edge is kept  free of corrosion and knives are generally sharpened on a daily basis. Corrosion can be avoided by keeping the exposed portion of the non-stainless portion  of the  blade clean and dry after each use.

Technically, it is a style of lamination used for blade construction, commonly used on blades that have a symmetrical grind (i.e. the edges are ground down from both sides to expose the edge, which is composed of the inner core material. In Japan, traditionally the steel used for the outer layer is Gukunan-tetsu 

The technique has been used outside Japan in modern knife making in the United States, often with new types of materials,  including D-2 and carbon fibre.

References 

Japanese swords
Metalworking